The Château de Vaudémont is a ruined 11th-century castle in the commune of Vaudémont in the Meurthe-et-Moselle département of France.

The castle is one of a group of four castles built around the same time on highland sites along the Moselle valley between Nancy and Metz in northeast France. The other three castles are Dieulouard, Mousson, and Prény; of the four, Château de Vaudémont is the largest and best preserved. It was built as a hill castle in the 11th century for the Counts of Vaudémont, possibly for Gérard I (1071 – c.1120). The architect is unknown. The remains are part of the curtain wall and the keep, the so-called tour Brunehaut (Brunehaut tower) constructed with recycled Gallo-Roman remains. It was repaired during the 15th century, dismantled in 1639 on the orders of Louis XIII, and restored in 1930.

It has been listed since 1840 as a monument historique by the French Ministry of Culture.

See also
List of castles in France

References
Notes

Bibliography

Further reading

External links
 
 

Ruined castles in Grand Est
Monuments historiques of Grand Est
Châteaux in Meurthe-et-Moselle

fr:Vaudémont#Lieux et monuments